Kangarh (also written as Kan Garh or Kanger) is a town near the Upper Tanawal valley in the Khyber Pakhtunkhwa province of Pakistan.

See also 
 Oghi (tehsil)
 Kala Dhaka
 Mansehra District

Mansehra District